Steven Delton Smyth  (born June 3, 1978) is an American former professional baseball pitcher. He played in Major League Baseball for the Chicago Cubs in their 2002 season.

Amateur career
A native of Brawley, California, Smyth attended the University of Southern California in Los Angeles, California. In 1998, he played collegiate summer baseball in the Cape Cod Baseball League for the Yarmouth-Dennis Red Sox. He was selected by the Cubs in the 4th round of the 1999 MLB Draft.

Professional career

Smyth spent five years (1999–2003) with the Chicago organization before joining the Atlanta Braves (2004) and Oakland Athletics (2004–2005) Minor League systems. After that, he played for the independent San Diego Surf Dawgs of the Golden Baseball League in part of two seasons spanning 2006–2006. He played winter ball with the Leones del Caracas club of the Venezuelan Professional Baseball League in 2006.

Smyth then pitched for several Minor League teams the next two years, appearing with the independent Edmonton Cracker-Cats and Long Beach Armada in 2008, during what turned out to be his last career season. Overall, he posted a 46-39 record with a 4.51 ERA in 145 minor league games, striking out 562 batters while walking 332 in 751 innings of work.

Personal
After leaving baseball, Smyth became a firefighter.

References

, or Retrosheet, or Pura Pelota (VPBL)

1978 births
Living people
American expatriate baseball players in Canada
American expatriate baseball players in Mexico
American sportspeople in doping cases
Baseball players from California
Chicago Cubs players
Cypress Chargers baseball players
Daytona Cubs players
Edmonton Cracker-Cats players
Eugene Emeralds players
Greenville Braves players
Iowa Cubs players
Lansing Lugnuts players
Leones del Caracas players
American expatriate baseball players in Venezuela
Long Beach Armada players
Major League Baseball pitchers
Mexican League baseball pitchers
Midland RockHounds players
People from Brawley, California
Rieleros de Aguascalientes players
Sacramento River Cats players
San Diego Surf Dawgs players
Stockton Ports players
Tomateros de Culiacán players
University of Southern California alumni
USC Trojans baseball players
Vaqueros Laguna players
West Tennessee Diamond Jaxx players
Yarmouth–Dennis Red Sox players
York Revolution players
Chinatrust Whales players
American expatriate baseball players in Taiwan